Hector School District 59  is a public school district in Hector, Pope County, Arkansas.

Schools 
Hector Elementary School, serving kindergarten through grade 6
 
 Hector High School, serving grades 7 through 12.

References

External links
 

Education in Pope County, Arkansas
School districts in Arkansas